The Vickers and Schumacher Buildings are a pair of historic adjoining commercial buildings in downtown Mobile, Alabama.  The two-story brick masonry buildings were completed in 1866 and once served to house the Schumacher Carriage Works.  They were placed on the National Register of Historic Places on December 22, 1983.  The buildings were purchased by Cornell Family Properties in 2005 and restored.

References

National Register of Historic Places in Mobile, Alabama
Commercial buildings completed in 1866
Commercial buildings on the National Register of Historic Places in Alabama
1866 establishments in Alabama